Jablanica is a village in the municipality of Lopare (Republika Srpska), Bosnia and Herzegovina.

Demographics 
According to the 2013 census, its population was 889, all of them living in the Lopare part, thus none in Čelić.

References

Populated places in Lopare
Populated places in Čelić